Chile women's national under-17 football team represents Chile in international youth football competitions.

Results and fixtures

Legend

2022

Players

Current squad
Player - Club

Goalkeeper 
Constanza Barrientos - Colo Colo 
Antonia Canales - Catholic University 
Tina Lingsch - Catholic University 

Defender 
Valentina Díaz - Colo Colo 
Yessenia Parra - Colo Colo 
Elisa Durán - Colo Colo 
Carolina Farias - University of Chile 
Emilia Pastrián - Santiago Morning 
Krishna Cabrera - Santiago Wanderers 
Martina Córdoba - Santiago Wanderers 

Midfielder 
Margarita Collinao - Colo Colo 
Llanka Groff - Sports La Serena 
Sonya Keefe - Boston College 

Forward 
Michelle Olivares - University of Chile 
Antonia Alarcón - University of Concepción 
Isidora Olave - Colo Colo 
Elisa Perez - Rangers 
Isabelle Kadzban - Florida Kraze Krush (USA)

Previous squads
2010 FIFA U-17 Women's World Cup

Competitive record

FIFA U-17 Women's World Cup
The team has qualified in 2010 and 2022.

South American Under-17 Women's Championship

See also
Chile women's national football team

References

External links
Official website
FIFA profile
La Roja Femenina Sub 17 jugará cuadrangular en Argentina 

Nat
Women's national under-17 association football teams
Under-17
Youth sport in Chile